Lugnet was a feldspar mine near Stockholm, Sweden. Mining at Lugnet begun in 1911 and ended in 1967.

References

1911 establishments in Sweden
1967 disestablishments in Sweden
Feldspar mines in Sweden
Haninge Municipality
Former mines in Sweden